Ephemera blanda is a species of common burrower mayfly in the family Ephemeridae. It is found in southeastern Canada and the southeastern United States.

References

Mayflies
Articles created by Qbugbot
Insects described in 1932